Count Lev Alekseyevich von Perovski (also transliterated as Perofsky, Perovskii, Perovskiy, Perovsky, Perowski, and Perowsky; also credited as L.A. Perovski) (9 September 1792 – 21 November 1856) was a Russian nobleman and mineralogist who also served as Minister of Internal Affairs under Nicholas I of Russia.

In 1845, he proposed the creation of the Russian Geographical Society.

The mineral perovskite is named for him.

References

Interior ministers of Russia
Politicians of the Russian Empire
Russian mineralogists
1792 births
1856 deaths
Burials at Lazarevskoe Cemetery (Saint Petersburg)
Imperial Moscow University alumni